Vance County High School (formerly Southern Vance High School) is a high school located at 925 Garrett Road in Henderson, North Carolina. The school's mascot is the Viper. The principal at VCHS is Mr. Nealie Whitt III.

The school is under the Title 1 policy. The whole county receives free breakfast and lunch because 99% of students are economically disadvantaged.

History

Southern Vance originally opened after Labor Day in 1990, following a split in the student population of the former Vance Senior High School by the school board in response to a growing population at the time. The original mascot was chosen by the 7th, 8th & 9th grade population of Henderson Junior High and the 10th grade class of Vance Senior High in Spring 1989. This particular segment of students was chosen as they would be the first classes to attend the new combined school. In addition, this same body selected the school colors—Light Blue / White / and Royal Blue Outline.

Problems with the school's floors soon materialized. By the end of the first school year, the floors had begun to show uneven spots throughout. Countless "bubbles" had risen throughout. Subsequent samples taken of the floor began a multi-year legal action against the contractor who had laid the floor.

Journalism at SVHS initially moved away from a traditional newspaper format. Instead, the school opted for a "Newsmagazine" format. Titled The Raider Review, the newsmagazine was different from the long-established "The Viking" at Northern Vance High.

Southern Vance was equipped with what was considered at the time a state-of-the art visual media center, including televisions in every room. In December 1991, Southern launched its morning newscast. Dubbed "WSVH-TV 13 Raider News at 8:20," the first broadcast was anchored by the legendary Southern Vance High news team of Randy Gupton, Tammy Earl Flowers, and Chris Wright with Sports.

WSVH-TV 13 Raider News was directed by Stewart Gay, and Mrs. Gill was the Executive Producer of the first broadcast.

The broadcast was traditionally signed off by Randy Gupton with the saying "And until next time ... Enjoy Life, People."

In March 2018, Vance County Schools announced that it was consolidating both high school campuses into one location as a cost-cutting measure. The new school, Vance County High School, would be located at the former Southern Vance High campus. Northern Vance later became the home of Vance Middle School, itself a consolidation of two other middle schools in the area.

Sports 

Vance County High School competes in a variety of sports as the "Vipers". These sports include Football (JV and Varsity), Men's Soccer (JV and Varsity), Women's Tennis, Volleyball (JV and Varsity), Cheerleading (Fall and Winter), Women's Golf, Indoor Track & Field (Men's and Women's), Outdoor Track & Field (Men's and Women's), Cross Country (Men's and Women's), Swimming (Men's and Women's), Wrestling, Softball, Baseball, Women's Soccer, Men's Golf, Men's Tennis, Women's Basketball (JV and Varsity), and Men's Basketball (JV and Varsity). The men's and women's basketball teams were the 2019 Conference Champions, winning the school's first championships.

The Vipers originally competed in the Northern Carolina 1A/2A Conference, but have since joined the Big 8 3A Conference.

Clubs 

 National Honor Society (NHS) 
 National Technical Honor Society (NTHS) 
 National Beta Club  
 Student Government Association (SGA) 
 Yearbook  
 Future Business Leaders of America (FBLA)

Students 

There are currently 1,033 students attending.

Teachers 

There are currently 70 full-time teachers.

Electives 
Vance County High School offers a Career and Technical Education (CTE) Internship class. This class offers 2 high school credits. One for completing the class and one for having an actual job.

Career and Technical Education (CTE) are monitored through the county school board and the State of North Carolina Department of Public Instruction (NCDPI).

References

Public high schools in North Carolina
Schools in Vance County, North Carolina